Greiz II is an electoral constituency (German: Wahlkreis) represented in the Landtag of Thuringia. It elects one member via first-past-the-post voting. Under the current constituency numbering system, it is designated as constituency 40. It covers the eastern part of the district of Greiz.

Greiz II was created for the 1994 state election. Since 2014, it has been represented by Christian Tischner of the Christian Democratic Union (CDU).

Geography
As of the 2019 state election, Greiz II covers the eastern part of the district of Greiz, specifically the municipalities of Berga/Elster, Bethenhausen, Brahmenau, Braunichswalde, Endschütz, Gauern, Greiz, Großenstein, Hilbersdorf, Hirschfeld, Kauern, Korbußen, Linda b. Weida, Mohlsdorf-Teichwolframsdorf, Neumühle/Elster, Paitzdorf, Pölzig, Reichstädt, Ronneburg, Rückersdorf, Schwaara, Seelingstädt, Teichwitz, and Wünschendorf/Elster.

Members
The constituency has been held by the Christian Democratic Union since its creation in 1994. Its first representative was Horst Krauße, who served from 1994 to 2014. Since 1999, it has been represented by Christian Tischner.

Election results

2019 election

2014 election

2009 election

2004 election

1999 election

1994 election

References

Electoral districts in Thuringia
1994 establishments in Germany
Greiz (district)
Constituencies established in 1994